Khara can refer to

Places
 Khara, Iran, a village in Isfahan Province, Iran
 Khara-Khoto, the ruins of a medieval city in western Mongolia
 Khara, Pakistan, a town in Punjab, Pakistan
 Khara, Nepal, a village in Nepal
 Khara, Raebareli, a village in Uttar Pradesh, India
 Khara, India, a village in Punjab, tarn taran near chohla sahib (Guri Sandhu’s) village

Other uses
 Khara (Ramayana), a character in the ancient Sanskrit epic the Ramayana
 Khara (surname), Surname or clan - Alternate transliterations are Khaara, Khaira, Khahra, Khehra - in Northern India, Pakistan and Afghanistan
 Kharak, a planet in the fictional Homeworld universe
 Studio Khara, an animation studio associated with Hideaki Anno
 Khara Boondi, an Indian spicy snack made of chickpeas
Khara, the disease that destroyed planet 4546B since thousand years ago in the video game Subnautica.

See also 
 Kara (disambiguation)
 Cara (disambiguation)